The First Four is a play-in round of the NCAA Division I men's and women's basketball tournaments. It consists of two games contested between the four lowest-ranked teams in the field, and two games contested between the four lowest-seeded "at-large" teams in the field, which determine the last four teams to qualify for the 64-team bracket that plays the first round.

In 2001, the champion of the recently-formed Mountain West Conference began to receive an automatic bid to the men's tournament. The NCAA did not wish to reduce the number of at-large teams in the tournament, which therefore expanded the field to 65 teams; to preserve a 64-team bracket for the first round, an Opening Round game would be played between the two lowest-seeded automatic qualifying teams, with the winner of this play-in game advancing to the first round.

In 2011, the men's tournament expanded to 68 teams, resulting in the expansion of the opening round to four games. Upon the adoption of this format, the opening round games were now referred to as the "first round games", and the round of 64—the tournament's first round proper—was now referred to as the "second round". However in 2016, the NCAA officially rebranded the games as the "First Four" (a colloquialism that had been used to refer to the games, in reference to the long-time branding of the tournament semi-finals as the "Final Four"), and returned to referring to the round of 64 as the "first round".

All of the Opening Round games and current-format men's First Four games, with the exception of 2021 (as the tournament was held entirely within the state of Indiana), have been played at the University of Dayton Arena in Dayton, Ohio. In 2022, the 68-team format and the First Four was extended to the Division I women's tournament for the first time.

History

Opening round (2001–2010)
The game was conceived after the Mountain West Conference, which had been formed in 1999 following the split of the Western Athletic Conference, was given an automatic bid for its conference champion, which made it the 31st conference to receive an automatic berth into the men's tournament. Unlike the women's tournament, which accommodated this change by eliminating an at-large bid to keep their field at 64 teams, the organizers of the men's tournament elected to keep their at-large entries at 34. In order to eliminate one of the teams to have a 64-team bracket, it became necessary for another game to be played between the two lowest-ranked teams among the automatic bid leagues.

Florida A&M (2004 and 2007) and Winthrop (2001 and 2010) were the only teams to appear in the game more than once.  The 2003 game was the only one to end in overtime.

First Four (2011–present)
On April 22, 2010, the NCAA announced that the men's tournament would expand to 68 teams, with four "Play-In Games" beginning with the 2011 tournament.

In 2011, the broadcast media began calling these games "The First Four" (as opposed to the "Final Four"); and, also used the term "first round games" interchangeably with "opening round games."  Formerly, the term "first round game" specifically referred to the first games played by the final 64 teams, not the teams in the opening round. Through the 2015 tournament, these games were known as "second round games," resulting in some confusion for those more accustomed to the round being known as the "first round" and the "second round" being used for the regional quarterfinals (field of 32). Effective with the 2016 tournament, the NCAA reverted to the traditional usage of "First Round" as referring to the first games played by the final 64 teams, and began officially using "First Four" to refer to the opening round games.

The First Four games consist of:
 Two games with four lowest-ranked teams (No. 65 vs. No. 66; No. 67 vs. No. 68)
 Two games with the four lowest-ranked at-large seeds

In November 2021, as part of the implementation on recommendations to address inequalities between the men's and women's NCAA basketball tournaments, the NCAA announced that the women's tournament would expand to 68 teams in 2022, adopting the same format as the men's event.

Criticism
Although analysts' initial reactions to the concept were skeptical, the first game, played on March 13, 2001, was a success, and few complaints were lodged. The games are prominent by attracting viewers on nights in which no other NCAA games are played.  Prior to the proposal of expansion, Syracuse University coach Jim Boeheim had advocated for an expansion of the tournament from 64 to 76 teams, which would include four opening round games for all of the 16th and also added opening round games for the 14th and 15th seeded teams. The expansion of play in games faced logistical challenges and lukewarm acceptance from then-NCAA President Myles Brand  and the corporate and media partners of the NCAA.  However, on April 22, 2010, the NCAA announced, as part of a new 14-year, US$10.8 billion agreement between CBS Sports and Time Warner's Turner Sports division, that the tournament would add three more play-in games, which in total came to be known as the "First Four."

The opening round games have also been criticized as a handicap for teams among the historically black colleges and universities (HBCUs). In every game from 2002 to 2010, one team was an HBCU, and at least one HBCU (two in 2018, 2019 and 2021) has participated in every First Four. However, the two conferences which are made up of HBCUs, the Mid-Eastern Athletic Conference (MEAC) and Southwestern Athletic Conference (SWAC), are often two of the lowest-rated conferences in the Ratings Percentage Index (RPI), and its successor since 2018–19, the NCAA Evaluation Tool (NET). Since each win in an opening round game is treated the same as a win in any other game for purposes of sharing in NCAA tournament revenue, athletic directors and commissioners of HBCU-heavy conferences often welcome the exposure and money gained. However, other HBCU officials argue that First Four games for conference tournament champions are unfair since they played their way into the tournament, and look at placing HBCU teams in the opening round as a sign of disrespect of HBCU programs.

Since its inception, the First Four games have been held at the University of Dayton Arena for every tournament except in 2021, when the entire tournament was moved to the state of Indiana due to COVID-19 concerns. Since the UD Arena is the home arena of Dayton's basketball team, it became particularly concerning when Dayton was selected to play Boise State in the First Four in 2015, in what was considered a virtual home game for Dayton. Boise State ended up losing to Dayton 56–55. Typically, all games of the NCAA men's basketball tournament are considered neutral-site games and in the rare instance when a tournament venue is also the home arena of a team in the tournament, that team will be placed away from that venue when the tournament bracket is created. However, since Dayton was one of the last four at-large teams in the tournament and all First Four games were to be played at the UD Arena, having them play the First Four on their home court was unavoidable.

Broadcasters 
The first Opening Round Game in 2001 was broadcast by cable network TNN—a sibling to tournament broadcaster CBS—with Tim Brando and Rick Pitino as commentators.

ESPN, which had not shown NCAA Tournament games since the early rounds of the 1989 tournament, then signed a deal to show the Opening Round game beginning in 2002. ESPN continued to cover this game through 2010, as the only one of 64 NCAA Tournament games not to be shown on a CBS network.

With the transition to the new CBS/Turner contract and the new First Four format in 2011, the round has been broadcast exclusively by TruTV.  In 2021, TBS joined in with TruTV because of the First Four being played in a single day (Thursday) as opposed to two days (Tuesday and Wednesday).

Format

Opening Round
The winner of the game was awarded the No. 16 seeded position in one of four regions of the tournament and next played the No. 1 seeded team of that region on the following Friday. Three of the top seeds to beat the opening game winner advanced to the national championship game and all three won the national championship (2002 Maryland, 2005 North Carolina and 2010 Duke). North Carolina was the only No. 1 seeded team matched against the opening round winner more than once (2005 & 2008).

Note that, despite the term "Play-In" game being used colloquially, the loser of the opening round game was still considered to have been in the tournament, as both teams met the qualifications for "automatic tournament entry" as stated in the NCAA Bylaws. At first, only the loser received credit for being in the game for purposes of its conference receiving a share of the NCAA Division I "basketball fund"; however, starting with the 2008 tournament, both teams received credit for playing. There was an actual "play-in" round in 1991, with six teams playing each other (Saint Francis, Pennsylvania versus Fordham; Coastal Carolina versus Jackson State; NE Louisiana versus Florida A&M) before the tournament bracket was announced; these games are not considered part of the 1991 tournament. Consequently, in 2001, Northwestern State technically became the first No. 16 seeded team to win a game in the men's NCAA tournament by virtue of the team's opening round victory.

First Four
The teams are not the eight lowest-ranked teams in the field; the four lowest-ranked at-large teams usually have higher rankings among the entire field of 68 than several of the automatic-bid teams coming from the smaller conferences. The four games are held to determine which teams will assume a place in the first round. Unlike other early games in the tournament, the teams are not matched with disparity intended. Rather, equality governs match-ups (e.g., in one game, two teams—usually two of the four lowest-ranked automatic-bid teams—might play for a No. 16 seeding in the first round, while in another game, two teams—usually two of the four lowest-ranked at-large teams—are usually trying to advance as a No. 11 seed).

While most NCAA tournament games are played Thursday through Sunday (with the final game on a Monday), the First Four games are played earlier in the first week, between Selection Sunday and the First Round on Thursday and Friday. As of 2017, two games are played on the Tuesday following Selection Sunday, and the remaining two are played on Wednesday. Once the First Four games are played, the four winning teams assume their places in the bracket of 64 teams, and must play again later that week, with little rest. The two Tuesday winners are paired with their next opponent on Thursday; and, the Wednesday winners play on Friday. With the Second Round being played on Saturday and Sunday, this scheduling allows for six consecutive days of competition during the first week of the tournament.

With the exception of 2019, at least one of the men's First Four winners has advanced past the First Round of the tournament every year since the format's inception. Five teams have advanced to the second weekend and the Sweet 16. VCU (2011) and UCLA (2021) are the only two First Four teams to reach either the Elite Eight or the Final Four.

All winners in the inaugural women's First Four in 2022 lost their First Round games.

Results
The below tables list the results of all "play-in" games, along with how each winning team fared in subsequent games.

Subsequent game results are listed with: round, score, opponent, and opponent's seed.

Round is noted as:

 R64 – Round of 64 (first round)
 R32 – Round of 32 (second round)
 S16 – Sweet 16 (regional semifinals)
 E8 – Elite Eight (regional finals)
 F4 – Final Four (national semifinals)
 NC – National Championship Game

Bold font indicates a win in the main tournament bracket by a team that advanced from the First Four.

(OT) indicates overtime.

Men's tournament

2001–2010
For these 10 tournaments, a single play-in game was contested, between the two lowest-ranked teams that had received automatic bids. The winning team then played the top-seeded team in their regional bracket. In each instance, the play-in winner lost to the top-seeded team by at least 13 points.

 denotes a team that went on to win the national championship

2011–present
Tournament results for First Four teams since the men's tournament expanded to 68 teams are shown in the table below.

Unless noted otherwise, the University of Dayton Arena in Dayton, Ohio, has hosted all games.

† Played at Mackey Arena, West Lafayette, Indiana (Host: Purdue University)

‡ Played at Simon Skjodt Assembly Hall, Bloomington, Indiana (Host: Indiana University Bloomington)

 Denotes a team that went on to win the national championship

 Denotes a team that went on to win the national championship that was later vacated by the NCAA

Women's tournament
Beginning in 2022, First Four games are also contested in the women's tournament.

The women's First Four games have been played at neutral sites.

References

Recurring sporting events established in 2011
Recurring sporting events established in 2022
NCAA Division I men's basketball tournament
NCAA Division I women's basketball tournament
Basketball competitions in Dayton, Ohio